Family Christian Academy may refer to:
 Family Christian Academy (Missouri)
 Family Christian Academy (Texas)